Bhowmick or Bhowmik is a Bengali Hindu surname, common among residents of the Indian state of West Bengal.

Notables 
 Anjana Bhowmick, Bengali film actress
 Devdaan Bhowmik, Bengali film actor
 Lalkamal Bhowmick, Indian footballer
 Mainak Bhaumik, Bengali film director
 Mani Lal Bhaumik, Indian-born American physicist and author
 Moushumi Bhowmik, Indian Bengali singer and songwriter
 Mrinmoy Bhowmick, Indian documentary filmmaker
 Partha Bhowmick, Indian politician
 Sachin Bhowmick, Indian Hindi film writer and director
 Subhash Bhowmick, Indian footballer

References 

Indian surnames
Bengali Hindu surnames